The Southern African Power Pool (SAPP) is a cooperation of the national electricity companies in Southern Africa under the auspices of the Southern African Development Community (SADC). The members of SAPP have created a common power grid between their countries and a common market for electricity in the SADC region.

Location
The secretariat of the 17-member country organization is located at 24 Golden Stairs, Emerald Hill, in Harare, the capital and largest city in Zimbabwe.

Overview
The Southern African Power Pool has many long-term goals it wishes to achieve. One of the main goals is to increase the accessibility of electricity to rural communities. Another goal is to improve the relationships between the member countries. There is need to develop sustainable development priorities, and to co-ordinate the planning of electric power.

Along with industrial productivity, electricity generation can assist in the Southern African Development Community (SADC)’s mandate of poverty elimination across Southern Africa. Only 5 percent of rural areas in Southern Africa have access to electricity. Lack of electric power impedes their access to clean water, limits the availability of food, and constrains access to clean, sustainable sanitation. In 2010, SADC passed the Regional Energy Access Strategy and Action Plan, which aims to combine regional energy resources as a means of ensuring the entire SADC region has access to affordable, sustainable electricity. The plan’s goal is to reduce the number of people in the region without access to energy by 50 percent in the next ten years. Then reduce the remaining population by 50 percent in the next five years, and continue cutting it in half every five years until the region has universal access.

The most recent developments to the Southern African Power Pool came between the years of 1995 and 2005, where multiple interconnections were added. In 1995, an interconnector that ran from South Africa to Zimbabwe was completed, a Mozambique-South Africa interconnector was fixed in 1997, a Mozambique-Zimbabwe interconnector was finished, and most recently two power lines connecting South Africa to Maputo were finished.

History
SAPP was founded in August 1995 at the SADC summit held in Kempton Park, South Africa. At that summit, member governments of SADC (excluding Mauritius) signed an Inter-Governmental Memorandum of Understanding for the formation of an electricity power pool in the region under the name of the Southern African Power Pool. Later, three other agreements were signed, including one between the respective electricity utilities in the member countries, another that lays down specific rules of operation and prices and the fourth agreement that spells out the operating procedures and guidelines.

Power trading between regions started in 1950 after the signed agreement between the Democratic Republic of Congo and Zambia. Other parts of the continent also started a power trading business until 1995. In 1995 SAPP was founded and it was the first power pool in Africa. Since then the SAPP influenced the energy market and started competitive energy markets such as a day-ahead market (DAM).

Every year, each member contributes a certain amount of money to the group as pre-determined in the document that set up the Power Pool. Today, most of the money that funds the Pool comes from donors, such as The World Bank and the Development Bank of Southern Africa.

Future plans
Currently being planned for future development is a Zambia-Tanzania power line, a Mozambique-Malawi power line, the fixing of the old Zambia power line, and the construction of a third Inga hydropower station by means of the Western Power Corridor Project.

Members

Member Status

The Botswansa Power Corporation, Electricidade de Mocambique, ESKOM, Eswatini Electricity Company, Lesotho Electricity Corporation, NAMPOWER, Societe Nationale d'Electricitite, Zesco Limited, and the Zimbabwe Electricity Supply Authority are operating members of the Power Pool.

The Electricity Supply Corporation of Malawi, Empresa Nacional de Electricidade, and the Tanzania Electricity Supply Company Ltd are the non-operating members of the Power Pool.

The Copperbelt Energy Corporation is the only Independent Transmission Company of the Power Pool.

Challenges

Despite being the most advanced power pool ever developed in Africa, the SAPP has some challenges and shortcomings. Its takes money to keep the pool running and the SAPP does not have the funds to create new investments. The SAPP also suffers from lack of infrastructure across the continent along with lack of maintenance for the existing infrastructure. By 2007, peak demand began to exceed installed capacity.

One major challenge is the lack of sufficient adequately skilled staff labor and the difficulty of retention of skilled workers. Power pools can only be sustained in areas with developed grid interconnections. The interconnection between some member states are inadequate. Trust between the members is of utmost importance.

Future Plans

Despite recent challenges, the SAPP have long committed goals that can help in its expansion and company’s growth. The following plans are investment projects, interconnected grid, electricity access, and competitive market. Investment projects that creates new revenue includes hydropower and clean coal power plant alternative over nuclear. They also plan to improve SAPP central grid to improve the link between North and South Africa regarding to the new alternative power plant, hydropower and clean coal. Interconnected grids can expand SAPP activities. Along with the current SAPP members, there are future plans to involve other areas such as Tanzania, Malawi and Angola. Electricity access would expand the use of electricity to more areas in order to make it accessible to new borders. Lastly, strengthen and regulating competitive markets plan that sets up new rules that help meets consumers and investors satisfaction.

Other African Power pools
There are five African Power Pools, (a) Southern African Power Pool (SAPP), (b) Eastern Africa Power Pool (EAPP) (c) Central African Power Pool (CAPP) (d) West African Power Pool (WAPP) and North African Power Pool (NAPP). The Democratic Republic of the Congo is the only country that is a member of three pools (SAPP, EAPP and CAPP). Burundi is part of EAPP and CAPP. Tanzania is a member of SAPP and EAPP.  Guinea is part of CAPP and WAPP.

See also

 Eastern Africa Power Pool
 Central African Power Pool
 West African Power Pool
 North African Power Pool

References

External links
 Website of Southern African Power Pool
 East African Power Pool

Electric power infrastructure in Africa
Electricity markets
Wide area synchronous grids
Organizations established in 1995
1995 establishments in South Africa
Harare
Organisations related to Southern Africa